The 1971 SMU Mustangs football team represented Southern Methodist University (SMU) as a member of the Southwest Conference (SWC) during the 1971 NCAA University Division football season. Led by tenth-year head coach Hayden Fry, the Mustangs compiled an overall record of 4–7 with a conference mark of 3–4, placing fifth in the SWC.

Schedule

Roster

References

SMU
SMU Mustangs football seasons
SMU Mustangs football